The Central Kentucky Blue Grass Seed Co. is an Early Commercial building located at 321 Henry Street in Lexington, Kentucky.  The company sold Kentucky blue grass seed. The building was listed on the National Register of Historic Places in 2005.

Its renovation earned a 2014 Historic Preservation Award from the Blue Grass Trust.

An identifier number, "FA-NS-1404", is associated with the property.

References

National Register of Historic Places in Lexington, Kentucky
Commercial buildings in Lexington, Kentucky
Commercial buildings on the National Register of Historic Places in Kentucky
Buildings designated early commercial in the National Register of Historic Places
Lawns
Seed companies